Amanda Sandrelli (born Amanda Paoli on 31 October 1964) is an Italian actress.

Born in Lausanne, she is the daughter of Italian singer Gino Paoli and actress Stefania Sandrelli. She debuted in Non ci resta che piangere, by Roberto Benigni and Massimo Troisi, in 1984.

Filmography 
Non ci resta che piangere (1984)
 (1984)
La Casa del Buon Ritorno (1986)
Strana la vita (1987)
 (1988)
Da domani (1988)
 (1989)
Chiodo a tradimento (1990)
A Violent Life (1990)
 (The Brave Little Tailor) (1990)
 (1991)
Donne sottotetto (1992)
 (1992)
Stefano Quantestorie (1993)
80 metriquadri (1993)
Olimpo Lupo (1995)
 (1996)
 (1996)
Nirvana (1997)
 (1997)
Oscar per due (1998)
Madri (1999)
 Perlasca – Un eroe Italiano (2002)
Il giudice Mastrangelo (2005)
 (2007)

Theatre
Buona notte ai sognatori (1985–1986)
Né in cielo, né in terra (1992)
Bruciati (1993)
Cinque (1994)
La Chunga (1994)
Gianni Ginetta e gli altri (1995)

References 

1964 births
Living people
People from Lausanne
Italian film actresses
Italian stage actresses
20th-century Italian actresses
21st-century Italian actresses
Ciak d'oro winners